Nanocochlea monticola  is a species of minute freshwater snail with a gill and an operculum, an aquatic gastropod mollusk in the family Hydrobiidae. This species is endemic to Australia.

References

Further reading
 A paper from Zootaxa

Gastropods of Australia
Nanocochlea
Vulnerable fauna of Australia
Gastropods described in 1993
Taxonomy articles created by Polbot